In mathematics, Maass forms or Maass wave forms are studied in the theory of automorphic forms. In contrast to the modular forms the Maass forms need not be holomorphic. They were studied first by Hans Maass in 1949.

General remarks
The group

operates on the upper half plane

by fractional linear transformations:

The Radon measure

 

 

A fundamental domain for the modular group  is given by

 

(see Modular form).

A function  is called -invariant, if  holds for all  and all .

For every measurable, -invariant function  the equation

 

holds. Here the measure  on the right side of the equation is the induced measure on the quotient

Classic Maass forms

Definition of the hyperbolic Laplace operator 

Definition of a Maass form

A Maass form for the group  is a complex-valued smooth function  on  satisfying

 
 
 

If

 

we call  Maass cusp form.

Relation between Maass forms and Dirichlet series 

Let  be a Maass form. Since 

we have:

Therefore  has a Fourier expansion of the form

 

with coefficient functions 

It is easy to show that  is Maass cusp form if and only if .

We can calculate the coefficient functions in a precise way. For this we need the Bessel function .

Definition: The Bessel function  is defined as

 

  

holds for all .

Furthermore, we have  for all .

Proof: We have 

 

By the definition of the Fourier coefficients we get

 

for 

Together it follows that

for 

In the second term we changed the order of integration and differentiation, which is allowed since f is smooth in y . We get a linear differential equation of second degree:

 

For  one can show, that for every solution  there exist unique coefficients  with the property 

For  every solution  has coefficients of the form

 

for unique .

The Bessel functions  grow exponentially, while the Bessel functions  decrease exponentially. Together with the polynomial growth condition 3) we get  (also ) for a unique . Q.E.D.

Even and odd Maass forms: Let . A Maass form  is called even, if  and odd if . If f is a Maass form, then  is an even Maass form and  an odd Maass form and it holds that .

Theorem: The L-function of a Maass form 
Let 

 

be a Maass cusp form.

If  is even or odd we get

Here  if  is even and  if  is odd. Then  satisfies the functional equation

Example: The non-holomorphic Eisenstein-series E 

where  is the Gamma function.

 

More precisely it converges uniformly on every set , for every compact set  and every .

E is a Maass form
We only show -invariance and the differential equation. A proof of the smoothness can be found in Deitmar or Bump. The growth condition follows from the Fourier expansion of the Eisenstein series.

We will first show the -invariance. Let

Proposition. E is -invariant.

Proof. Define: 

Since 

 

we obtain

Furthermore, it follows that

since the map 

 

is a bijection (a) follows.

(b) We have  for all .

For  we get

Together with (a),  is also invariant under . Q.E.D.

Proposition. E is an eigenform of the hyperbolic Laplace operator

We need the following Lemma:

More precisely for all  we have: 

Proof: The group  is generated by the elements of the form 

One calculates the claim for these generators and obtains the claim for all . Q.E.D.

We have:

Furthermore, one has

 

and so 

In order to obtain the claim for all , consider the function . By explicitly calculating the Fourier expansion of this function, we get that it is meromorphic.

The Fourier-expansion of E
The nonholomorphic Eisenstein series has a Fourier expansion

where

It is holomorphic except for simple poles at 

The Eisenstein series satisfies the functional equation

for all .

Locally uniformly in  the growth condition

holds, where 

The meromorphic continuation of E is very important in the spectral theory of the hyperbolic Laplace operator.

Maass forms of weight k

Congruence subgroups
For  let  be the kernel of the canonical projection

We call  principal congruence subgroup of level . A subgroup  is called congruence subgroup, if there exists , so that . All congruence subgroups are discrete.

Let 

 

The set  is uniquely determined by the fundamental domain . Furthermore,  is finite.

Maass forms of weight k
Let  be a congruence subgroup and 

We define the hyperbolic Laplace operator  of weight  as

This is a generalization of the hyperbolic Laplace operator .

where 

It can be shown that

holds for all  and every .

Therefore,  operates on the vector space

.

Definition.

The term moderate growth at cusps needs clarification. Let  be another cusp. Let . Then , where  is the congruence subgroup .

Definition. If  contains a principal congruence subgroup of level , we say that  is cuspidal at infinity, if

 

We say that  is cuspidal at the cusp  if  is cuspidal at infinity. If  is cuspidal at every cusp, we call  a cusp form.

We give a simple example of a Maass form of weight  for the modular group:

Example. Let  be a modular form of even weight  for  Then  is a Maass form of weight  for the group .

The spectral problem

modulo functions with  The integral is well defined, since the function  is -invariant. This is a Hilbert space with inner product

There  is a positive semidefinite symmetric operator. It can be shown, that there exists a unique self-adjoint continuation on 

The spectrum belonging to the orthogonal complement has a continuous part and can be described with the help of (modified) non-holomorphic Eisenstein series, their meromorphic continuations and their residues. (See Bump or Iwaniec).

This is because a discrete cocompact subgroup has no cusps. Here all of the space  is a sum of eigenspaces.

Embedding into the space L2(Γ \ G)
 is a locally compact unimodular group with the topology of  Let  be a congruence subgroup. The group  is unimodular and since the counting measure is a Haar-measure on the discrete group ,  is also unimodular. By the Quotient Integral Formula there exists a -right-invariant Radon measure  on the locally compact space . Let  be the corresponding -space. This space decomposes into a Hilbert space direct sum:

 

where 

 

and 

The Hilbert-space  can be embedded isometrically into the Hilbert space . The isometry is given by the map

 is a Hilbert space carrying an operation of the group , the so-called right regular representation:

One is interested in a decomposition into irreducible subrepresentations. This is only possible if  is cocompact. If not, there is also a continuous Hilbert-integral part. The interesting part is, that the solution of this problem also solves the spectral problem of Maass forms. (see Bump, C. 2.3)

Maass cusp form
A Maass cusp form, a subset of Maass forms, is a function on the upper half-plane that transforms like a modular form but need not be holomorphic.

Definition
Let k be an integer, s be a complex number, and Γ be a discrete subgroup of SL2(R). A Maass form of weight k for Γ with Laplace eigenvalue s is a smooth function from the upper half-plane to the complex numbers satisfying the following conditions:

For all  and all , we have 
We have , where  is the weight k hyperbolic Laplacian defined as 
The function  is of at most polynomial growth at cusps.

A weak Maass form is defined similarly but with the third condition replaced by "The function  has at most linear exponential growth at cusps". Moreover,  is said to be harmonic if it is annihilated by the Laplacian operator.

Major results
Let  be a weight 0 Maass cusp form. Its normalized Fourier coefficient at a prime p is bounded by p7/64 + p−7/64. This theorem is due to Henry Kim and Peter Sarnak. It is an approximation toward Ramanujan-Petersson conjecture.

Higher dimensions
Maass cusp forms can be regarded as automorphic forms on GL(2). It is natural to define Maass cusp forms on GL(n) as spherical automorphic forms on GL(n) over the rational number field. Their existence is proved by Miller, Mueller, etc.

Automorphic representations of the adele group

The group GL2(A)
Let  be the ring of rational adeles,  the ring of the finite (rational) adeles and for a prime number  let  be the field of p-adic numbers. Furthermore, let  be the ring of the p-adic integers (see Adele ring). Define . Then:

Then  locally compact group, if we equip it with the restricted product topology.

The group  is isomorphic to

 

Let 

The subgroup

(see Adele Ring for a definition of the absolute value of an Idele).

The quotient  is not compact but has finite Haar-measure.

By harmonic analysis one also gets that  is unimodular.

Adelisation of cuspforms
We now want to embed the classical Maass cusp forms of weight 0 for the modular group into . This can be achieved with the "strong approximation theorem", which states that the map

is a -equivariant homeomorphism. So we get

and furthermore

Maass cuspforms of weight 0 for modular group can be embedded into

By the strong approximation theorem this space is unitary isomorphic to

which is a subspace of 

In the same way one can embed the classical holomorphic cusp forms.

We call  the space of automorphic forms of the adele group.

Cusp forms of the adele group
Let  be a Ring and let  be the group of all  where . This group is isomorphic to the additive group of R.

We call a function  cusp form, if

holds for almost all.

One is again interested in a decomposition of  into irreducible closed subspaces.

We have the following theorem:

The space  decomposes in a direct sum of irreducible Hilbert-spaces with finite multiplicities :

 

The calculation of these multiplicities  is one of the most important and most difficult problems in the theory of automorphic forms.

Cuspidal representations of the adele group 

One can show, that every cuspidal representation is admissible.

The admissibility is needed to proof the so-called Tensorprodukt-Theorem anzuwenden, which says, that every irreducible, unitary and admissible representation of the group  is isomorphic to an infinite tensor product

 

The  are irreducible representations of the group . Almost all of them need to be umramified.

(A representation  of the group   is called unramified, if the vector space

 

is not the zero space.)

A construction of an infinite tensor product can be found in Deitmar,C.7.

Automorphic L-functions 
By the tensor product theorem,  is of the form  (see cuspidal representations of the adele group)

Let  be a finite set of places containing  and all ramified places .

where  is a so-called local L-function of the local representation . A construction of local L-functions can be found in Deitmar C. 8.2.

This is possible, since , satisfies certain functional equations.

See also
Harmonic Maass form
Mock modular form
Real analytic Eisenstein series
Automorphic form
Modular form
Voronoi formula

References 

Anton Deitmar: Automorphe Formen. Springer, Berlin/ Heidelberg u. a. 2010, .

 Henryk Iwaniec : Spectral Methods of Automorphic Forms (Graduate Studies in Mathematics). American Mathematical Society; Auflage: 2. (November 2002), .

Automorphic forms